Mihai Velisar (born 30 August 1998) is a Romanian professional footballer who plays as a left-back for Liga II club Concordia Chiajna, on loan from Liga I club Petrolul Ploiești.

Club career

Petrolul Ploiești and Gloria Buzău loan
Velisar made his senior debut for boyhood club Petrolul Ploiești on 24 October 2017, starting in 3–4 penalty shoot-out loss to Mioveni in the Cupa României. It was his only appearance of the season, as his team achieved promotion to the Liga II.

Velisar played in four matches for "the Yellow Wolves" during the first half of the 2018–19 campaign, before returning to the third division on loan with Gloria Buzău in January 2019.

Gaz Metan Mediaș
Velisar was sent out on loan to Liga I club Gaz Metan Mediaș in the 2019 summer transfer window, and made his debut on 15 July by featuring the full 90 minutes in a 2–2 league draw with Chindia Târgoviște. On 19 August that year, he scored his first goal in a 3–0 win over Voluntari, and six days later netted again in a 4–0 defeat of FCSB.

At the start of November 2019, Velisar signed a permanent contract with Gaz Metan after the latter paid a previously-agreed €15,000 transfer fee to Petrolul Ploiești. He amassed 35 games during his first year in Sibiu County, with the Alb-negrii finishing sixth overall in the league table.

Return to Petrolul Ploiești
On 10 January 2022, Velisar was re-signed by Petrolul Ploiești amid financial issues at Gaz Metan Mediaș, with his former side retaining 15% interest on a future transfer.

Career statistics

Club

Honours
Petrolul Ploiești
Liga II: 2021–22
Liga III: 2017–18

Gloria Buzău
Liga III: 2018–19

References

External links

1998 births
Living people
Sportspeople from Ploiești
Romanian footballers
Association football defenders
Liga I players
Liga II players
Liga III players
FC Petrolul Ploiești players
FC Gloria Buzău players
CS Gaz Metan Mediaș players
CS Concordia Chiajna players